The Empty Man is a comic book series created by writer Cullen Bunn and artist Vanesa R. Del Rey in 2014, published by Boom! Studios.

Premise

Film adaptation
On February 9, 2016, it was announced that 20th Century Fox acquired the Boom! Studios graphic novel for a feature film, The Empty Man, with David Prior hired to write and direct the film. The supernatural thriller film would be produced by Ross Richie and Stephen Christy. On July 7, 2016, James Badge Dale was hired to star in the film for the lead role as an ex-cop, plagued by the violent death of his wife and son, who tries to find a missing girl. On September 27, 2016, Aaron Poole was cast in the film to play Paul, an outdoorsy adventurer. The film was scheduled to be theatrically released on August 7, 2020, by 20th Century Studios, but it was eventually released on October 23, 2020, due to the COVID-19 pandemic.

References

External links
The Empty Man #1 Review

2014 graphic novels
American comics adapted into films
Boom! Studios limited series
Boom! Studios titles